Godbout is a village municipality in the Côte-Nord region of Quebec, Canada. It is located at the mouth of the Godbout River on the north shore of the Saint Lawrence River.

Godbout is accessible via Quebec Route 138 and by ferry from Matane.

Environment

A map of the Ecological regions of Quebec places the Gobout area in ecological region 5g Hautes collines de Baie-Comeau — Sept-Îles in the eastern fir/white birch domain of the boreal zone.
The Godbout River is known as one of the best of Quebec's salmon rivers and also holds speckled trout.
About  of the river is managed by a zone d'exploitation contrôlée (managed use zone), the Zec des Rivières-Godbout-et-Mistassini.
The downstream Cap-Nord section is owned by a private club, but the right to fish it may be obtained through an agreement with the ZEC.

History
The native Innu hunted and fished near the mouth of the river that they called "Eddy River". This stream was renamed in honour of Nicolas Godeboust (1634–1674), who served as navigator and river pilot along the North Shore before becoming a settler on Orléans Island in 1670. That same year, Jesuit missionary Charles Albanel made mention of the "Godebout River" where he had met an indigenous group from the Sept-Îles area, the Oumamioueks. And Jean-Baptiste-Louis Franquelin referred to this river as "Godebou" on his map of 1684.

In 1684, a fur trading post was established at the river, and then indigenous groups settled around the post. They remained along the coast, hunting on the gulf in the winter and salmon fishing during the summer, but for a part of autumn they returned into the forest. After 1720, the post gained importance due to the seal hunt. Seals were hunted not only for their meat, but also for the fat that was melted, put in barrels, and sold cheaply.

Circa 1850, the Godbout region — from Pointe-des-Monts to Pointe à la Croix — counted up to twenty-five families of Innu seal hunters. But from 1860 onward, the French population really began to grow. At first, they were former employees of the trading post that by then was managed by the Hudson's Bay Company. First, a certain Théodule Savard, then the son of another employee, Napoléon-Alexandre Comeau, who moved to the village in his early teenage years. Comeau managed the salmon fishing and guarded against poachers. The Innu lost access to the river and were prevented from exercising their traditional subsistence fishing for salmon. Consequently, the indigenous population gradually decreased and at the end of the 19th century, few indigenous families remained and most had moved to the Betsiamites Reserve.

In 1877, the Godbout Post Office opened. The place developed quickly when a forestry company, the St-Régis, started large scale logging operations in the interior forests. This led to new infrastructure such as a wharf, a dam, a log flume, and a network of roads to the various logging camps. In the village, it led to the construction of a hotel, shops, houses, a cookery, and a clinic. In 1926, the local parish was formed. In 1933, an attempt was made to set up a municipality but that was not realized until 1955.

In 1971, the St-Régis mill closed, leading to job loss and economic hardship in Godbout. The younger people would seek work elsewhere, resulting in some aging of the population. But this trend is somewhat reversed with the development of tourism in the area.

Demographics 

Economy
The Matane—Godbout ferry is the village's main employer, either through direct employment, or by creating business for nearby restaurants and caterers. Tourism also provides opportunities for outfitters by catering to salmon fishing and other seasonal outdoor activities.

See also 
 Société des traversiers du Québec

References

Incorporated places in Côte-Nord
Villages in Quebec
Hudson's Bay Company trading posts